The 169th Airlift Squadron (169 AS) is a unit of the Illinois Air National Guard 182d Airlift Wing located at Peoria Air National Guard Base, Peoria, Illinois. The 169th is equipped with the C-130H3 Hercules.

History

World War II
The 304th Fighter Squadron was activated at Morris Field, North Carolina with the 98th, 303d, and 304th Fighter Squadrons assigned. It received its initial cadre from the 20th Fighter Group. The squadron operated as replacement training unit, flying primarily P-40 Warhawks and P-51 Mustangs, but also other fighter aircraft. The squadron and its components were disbanded in 1944 in a major reorganization of the Army Air Forces (AAF) in which all units not programmed to be transferred overseas were replaced by AAF Base Units to free up manpower for overseas deployment.  The 341st AAF Base Unit (Replacement Training Unit, Fighter) took over the group's equipment at Pinellas.

Illinois Air National Guard
The wartime 304th Fighter Squadron was re-constituted and re-designated as the 169th Fighter Squadron on 24 May 1946.  It was allotted to the Illinois Air National Guard, being organized at Greater Peoria Airport, Illinois and was extended federal recognition on 21 June 1947. The 169th Fighter Squadron was bestowed the history, honors, and colors of the 304th Fighter Squadron. The squadron was equipped with the F-51D Mustang and was assigned to the Illinois ANG 126th Bombardment Group (Light), at Chicago Municipal Airport.

Korean War mobilization

In February 1951. The unit was ordered to active service on 1 April 1951 as a result of the Korean War. The unit was initially assigned to Tactical Air Command at Langley AFB, Virginia.

The wing moved to Bordeaux-Merignac Air Base, France with the first elements arriving in November 1951. The unit was assigned to United States Air Forces in Europe. By 10 November, Bordeaux was considered an operational base and was assigned to the 12th Air Force.

At Bordeaux, the aircraft were marked in Black/Yellow/Red, and it flew B-26's for training and maneuvers and stayed at Bordeaux AB until being transferred Laon-Couvron Air Base, France on 25 May 1952 where it remained for the balance of the year.  The 169th was relieved from active duty and transferred, without personnel and equipment, back to the control of the Illinois ANG on 1 January 1953.

Cold War

After returning to Peoria, the 169th returned to flying the Mustang, receiving the very-long distance F-51H which was designed as an escort fighter for B-29s in the Pacific Theater during World War II.  In 1954 the 169th FBS obtained the copyright for The Chief, a Walt Disney cartoon character, to display as their emblem. The obsolete Mustangs were retired in 1956 and for two years, the squadron flew T-6G Texan trainers.  In 1958, the squadron received its first F-84F Thunderstreak, and began a tactical fighter mission in the late 1950s.

On 1 July 1961, the parent 125th Wing's mission was changed to an air refueling one and the squadron was assigned the KC-97 Stratofreighter aircraft.  The 169th flew the first Air National Guard air-to-air refueling mission in 1961.

On 1 October 1961, as a result of the 1961 Berlin Crisis, the 169th was again mobilized and assigned to the Missouri ANG 131st Tactical Fighter Wing, and again equipped with F-84F Thunderstreak tactical fighters.  Due to budget shortfalls, the squadron physically remained at Peoria while the 131st TFW and its 110th Tactical Fighter Squadron deployed to Toul-Rosières Air Base, France as the USAFE 7131st Tactical Fighter Wing (Provisional). During the next year, elements of the 169th were rotated from Peoria to Toul Air Base as needed.

While in France, the Guardsmen assumed regular commitments on a training basis with the U.S. 7th Army as well as maintaining a 24-hour alert status. The 7131st exchanged both air and ground crews with the Royal Danish Air Force's 730th Tactical Fighter Squadron at Skydstrup Air Station, Denmark, during May 1962. As the Berlin situation subsided, all activated ANG units were ordered to be returned to the United States and released from active duty. The 7131st TFW was inactivated in place in France on 19 July 1962 leaving its aircraft and equipment to USAFE.

Upon its return to Illinois State Control, the Illinois Air National Guard authorized the 169th Tactical Fighter Squadron to expand to a group level, and the 182d Tactical Fighter Group was established by the National Guard Bureau on 15 October 1962. The 169th TFS became the group's flying squadron. Other squadrons assigned into the group were the 182d Headquarters, 182d Material Squadron (Maintenance), 182d Combat Support Squadron, and the 182d USAF Dispensary.

During the 1960s the squadron continued to operate its F-84F Thunderstreaks, and the unit was not activated during the Vietnam War. In May 1969, the F-84Fs were retired and 182d TFG was re-designated as the 182d Tactical Air Support Group (TASG); flying Forward Air Control (FAC) missions.   The 169th was equipped with light observation U-3A/B Blue Canoe and in January 1970, the O-2A Skymaster aircraft.  The group's mission being to perform visual reconnaissance, as the FAC flew light aircraft slowly over the rough terrain at low altitude to maintain constant aerial surveillance over a combat area. By patrolling the same area constantly, the FACs grew very familiar with the terrain, and they learned to detect any changes that could indicate enemy forces hiding below.  Members of the 182d TASG provided relief assistance during state active duty for the Canton tornado disaster in July 1975.   In 1976, the 182d TASG was awarded its first Air Force Outstanding Unit Award.

In 1979, the squadron received OA-37B Dragonfly jet FAC aircraft from the New York and Maine Air National Guard, continuing the FAC mission.   The 182d TASG received an "Excellent" rating on its first Operational Readiness Inspection (ORI) under the 12th Air Force, and the group was awarded its second Air Force Outstanding Unit award in 1985.   In January 1991, 138 group personnel were called to active duty during the 1991 Gulf War and deployed to United States Central Command Air Forces (CENTAF).

Post Cold War era
In March 1992 the A-37s were finally retired. and the group received the Block 15 F-16A/B Fighting Falcon Air Defense Fighter (ADF).  It was re-designated as the 182d Fighter Group on 15 March.  In June 1993, members served on state active duty in response to the Mississippi River flooding of southern Illinois.

Due to government budget constraints and military restructuring after the Cold War, the 182d FG converted to the C-130E Hercules and was re-designated the 182d Airlift Wing (AW) effective 1 October 1995.  In 1996, the wing began participation in ongoing flying missions for Operation Joint Endeavor in Bosnia. In 1997, the 182d AW celebrated its 50th anniversary and received an "Excellent" in its first Air Mobility Command (AMC) ORI.

Global War on Terrorism
After the September 11 attacks, members of the wing were called up to support the Air Force at various locations around the world. During a September 2002 deployment to Oman, wing aircraft flew combat supply missions into Afghanistan for Operation Enduring Freedom. On 29 March 2003, SSgt Jacob Frazier of the 169th Air Support Operations Squadron (ASOS) was killed in action while serving with Army Special Forces in Afghanistan. He was the first member of the wing to die in combat.

In March 2003, immediately following mobilization, six aircraft and over 350 personnel were deployed to Minhad, United Arab Emirates, for Operation Iraqi Freedom. These airmen returned in August after providing airlift support throughout the theater. Since that mobilization, smaller numbers of wing personnel and aircraft have continually supported Operations Enduring Freedom and Iraqi Freedom. On 28 December 2003, a wing crew delivered earthquake relief supplies to Iran, becoming the first US aircraft to land there since 1981.

Beginning in January 2005, the wing converted from the C-130E to the newer H3 model. In October 2006, the wing received a rating of "Excellent" after serving as the lead wing during an AMC ORI. On 3 February 2007, the wing was awarded its third Air Force Outstanding Unit Award for the period from 1 August 2003 to 31 July 2005. Some personnel remain deployed to combat zones as part of Air and Space Expeditionary units while other members of the wing continue routine worldwide support to the Air Force

Lineage
 Constituted 304th Fighter Squadron on 16 July 1942
 Activated on 23 July 1942
 Disbanded on 1 May 1944; replaced by "Squadron C", 341st Army Air Forces Base Unit (Replacement Training Unit, Fighter).
 Re-constituted, and re-designated 169th Fighter Squadron and allotted to Illinois ANG on 24 May 1946
 Extended federal recognition on 21 June 1947
 Ordered to active service on 1 April 1951
 Re-designated: 169th Fighter-Interceptor Squadron on 1 July 1952
 Re-designated: 169th Fighter-Bomber Squadron on 1 December 1952
 Relieved from active duty and returned to Illinois state control. 1 January 1953
 Re-designated: 169th Fighter-Interceptor Squadron on 1 July 1955
 Re-designated: 169th Tactical Fighter Squadron on 10 November 1958
 Re-designated: 169th Air Refueling Squadron on 1 July 1961
 Ordered to active service on 1 October 1961
 Re-designated: 169th Tactical Fighter Squadron on 1 October 1961
 Relieved from active duty and returned to Illinois state control. 31 August 1962
 Re-designated: 169th Tactical Air Support Squadron on 16 May 1969
 Re-designated: 169th Fighter Squadron on 15 March 1992
 Re-designated: 169th Airlift Squadron on 1 October 1995

Assignments
 337th Fighter Group, 23 July 1942 – 1 May 1944
 66th Fighter Wing, 21 June 1947
 126th Bombardment Group (Light), 29 June 1947
 126th Composite Wing, in Nov 1950
 126th Bombardment Wing, in Feb 1951
 126th Fighter-Bomber Wing, 1 January 1953
 126th Fighter-Interceptor Wing, 1 July 1955
 126th Air Refueling Wing, 1 July 1961
 131st Tactical Fighter Wing, 1 October 1961
 Attached to: 7123d Tactical Wing (USAFE), 1 October 1961 – 31 August 1962
 182d Tactical Fighter Group, 15 October 1962
 182d Tactical Air Support Group, 16 May 1969
 182d Fighter Group, 15 March 1992
 182d Operations Group, 1 Oct 1995–present.

Stations
 Morris Army Airfield, North Carolina, 23 July 1942
 Myrtle Beach Bombing Range, South Carolina, 23 July 1942
 Pinellas Army Airfield, Florida, 30 August 1942 – 1 May 1944
 Greater Peoria Airport, Illinois, 21 June 1947
 Operated from: Bordeaux-Mérignac AB, France, 1 November 1951 – 25 May 1952
 Operated from: Laon-Couvron AB, France, 25 May 1952 – 31 December 1952
 Elements operated from: Toul-Rosieres AB, France, 1 October 1961 – 31 August 1962
 Designated: Peoria Air National Guard Base, Illinois, 1991–Present

Aircraft

 P-39 Airacobra, 1942
 P-43 Lancer, 1942
 P-40 Warhawk, 1942–1944
 F-51D Mustang, 1947–1951, 1954–1956
 F-51H Mustang, 1951–1954
 T-28A Trojan, 1956–1958
 F-84F Thunderstreak, 1958–1969

 KC-97 Stratofreighter, 1961
 U-3A/B Blue Canoe, 1969–1970
 O-2A Skymaster, 1970–1979
 OA-37B Dragonfly, 1979–1992
 F-16A/B Fighting Falcon, 1992–1995
 C-130E Hercules, 1995–2007
 C-130H3 Hercules, 2007–present

References

External links

Squadrons of the United States Air National Guard
Peoria County, Illinois
169
Military units and formations in Illinois
Military units and formations established in 1942
1942 establishments in North Carolina